César Calvo de Araujo (1910 -1970) was a Peruvian writer and painter. He was born in Yurimaguas, Loreto, Peru in 1910 and died in Lima in 1970. A street and an art gallery in Iquitos are named after him.

Paintings

Native of the Loreto Province, this painter and writer had dedicated all his affective attention to describe his homeland where he has lived alternating with visits to Lima, he often did exhibits in Lima, always about jungle region topics. The rivers, ponds, the quiet dead waters of the native land swamps do not have any secrets for him, as well as the study of the natives type and the colorful scenes from the riverbanks with their canoes loaded of woodland fruits and their oarsmen shining sweat from the tropical sun.

The art of Cesar Calvo belongs to the narrative and figurative realism. He seizes his scenes directly from the jungle or port life in Iquitos and other places of our tropics but when he does it he does not allow himself drag by the excesses of picturesque details and his painting is rather of damp gray tones, it seems as his palette search the darkness of the closed mounts where weed gets in between with a thick roof of foliage between the soil and the solar light. And when the countryside is open, under the sky that reflects itself in the smooth surface of the slow jungle rivers, he paints it in moments of storm cloud or from a twilight grayish distance.

Books
His most known book is "Paiche", described by himself on its prolog as a Socialist novel, written in a mix of formal Spanish and Amazonic dialectal Spanish.

External links 
 Vídeo de vida y obra de César Calvo de Araújo
 César Calvo Araujo - Loreto (1910) (About his paintings)
  Blog of Calvo de Araújo 
(About his life and paintings)

Peruvian artists
Peruvian male writers
1910 births
1970 deaths
20th-century Peruvian painters
20th-century Peruvian male artists
Peruvian male painters